The Temple of Isis, also known as an Iseum (from Latin) or Iseion (from Greek), may refer to:

 The temple of Isis at Philae, Egypt
 The temple of Isis at Behbeit el-Hagar, Egypt
 The temple of Isis at Menouthis, Egypt
 The temple of Isis on Antirhodos in Alexandria, Egypt
 The temple of Isis on Delos, Greece
 The Temple of Isis and Serapis on the Campus Martius in Rome, Italy
 The Temple of Isis at Pompeii, Italy
 The reconstructed temple of Isis at Szombathely, Hungary

See also 
 Isis Temple, a rocky prominence in the Grand Canyon, US
 The Isis-Urania Temple, a temple of the Hermetic Order of the Golden Dawn

Temples of Isis